Sardar Muhammad Idrees is a Pakistani politician who served a Member of the Provincial Assembly of Khyber Pakhtunkhwa from 2013 to 2018. Previously he had been a member of the Provincial Assembly of the North-West Frontier Province from 2002 to 2007.

Education
He has a degree in Bachelors of Arts.

Political career

He was elected to the Provincial Assembly of the North-West Frontier Province as an independent candidate from Constituency PF-48 (Abbottabad-V) in 2002 Pakistani general election. He received 13,928 votes and defeated a candidate of Muttahida Majlis-e-Amal (MMA). He joined Jamiat Ulema-e Islam (F) (JUI-F) after getting elected. In December 2002, he was inducted into the North-West Frontier Province (NWFP) provincial cabinet of Chief Minister Akram Khan Durrani and was appointed as Provincial Minister of NWFP for local government and rural development.

He ran for the seat of the Provincial Assembly of the North-West Frontier Province as a candidate of MMA from Constituency PF-48 Abbottabad-V in 2008 Pakistani general election but was unsuccessful. He received 22,354 votes and lost the seat to a candidate of Pakistan Muslim League (N). In November 2008, he quit JUI-F and joined Pakistan Peoples Party (PPP).

He was re-elected to the Provincial Assembly of Khyber Pakhtunkhwa as a candidate of Pakistan Tehreek-e-Insaf from Constituency PK-48 Abbottabad-V in 2013 Pakistani general election. He received 32,998 votes and defeated a candidate of Pakistan Muslim League (N).

He also contested the 2018 General Elections but lost to Sardar Aurangzeb of Pakistan Muslim League (N).

References

Living people
Khyber Pakhtunkhwa MPAs 2013–2018
Pakistan Tehreek-e-Insaf politicians
North-West Frontier Province MPAs 2002–2007
Year of birth missing (living people)